Antoine Dignef (3 October 1910 – 9 April 1991) was a Belgian cyclist. He is best known for finishing 3rd overall and winning two stages of the Vuelta a España, making him the first ever winner of a stage in the Vuelta. He also won Scheldeprijs in 1938 and finished second in the 1935 Paris–Nice.

Major results

1932
 4th Overall Volta a Catalunya
1st Stages 2 & 7
1933
 3rd Overall Volta a Catalunya
1st Stage 7
1934
 2nd Overall Tour of Belgium
 5th Overall Volta a Catalunya
 9th Liège–Bastogne–Liège
1935
 2nd Overall Paris–Nice
1st Stage 2
 3rd Overall Vuelta a España
1st Stages 1 & 4
 9th Paris–Roubaix
1936
 9th La Flèche Wallonne
 9th Overall Paris–Nice
1938
 1st Scheldeprijs
1939
 2nd Overall Tour of Belgium
1st Stage 3
 4th Overall Tour de Luxembourg

References

1910 births
1991 deaths
Belgian male cyclists
Belgian Vuelta a España stage winners
Cyclists from Limburg (Belgium)